"Nautilus" clarkanus is an extinct species of nautiloid. It lived during the Lower Carboniferous. Fossil specimens have been uncovered in the Spergen Hill Limestone formation of Indiana.

References
 On the Fauna of the Lower Carboniferous limnestones of Spergen Hill, Ind., with a revision of the descriptions of its Fossils hitherto published, and illustrations of the species from the original type series

Prehistoric nautiloids
Carboniferous cephalopods
Carboniferous animals of North America